Mohamed (Mo) El-Aref El-Hawary (born 3 February 1943 in Sohag – died 26 July 2019 in Halifax), was an Egyptian-born Canadian scientist of electric power system studies and the involvement of traditional/modern optimization algorithms, fuzzy systems, and artificial neural networks in their applications. El-Hawary was a mathematician, electrical engineer, computational intelligence researcher and professor of electrical and computer engineering at Dalhousie University.

El-Hawary served as general chair for many conferences. He is a lecturer for the IEEE Power and Energy Society (IEEE-PES), the IEEE Industry Applications Society (IEEE-IAS), and IEEE Canada. Also, he is a fellow of IEEE, EIC, CAE, and CCPE.

In electric power systems engineering, El-Hawary pioneered computational and artificial intelligence solutions to problems such as: power flow analysis, optimal power flow, economic load dispatching, unit commitment, power system stability, power system protection and relaying, power system quality, power system security, power system communication and networking, control theory, fuzzy system, artificial neural network, etc. Additionally, he authored the book Electric Power system Design and Analysis, an academic textbook about electric power engineering.

Biography

Personal life 

Mohamed El-Aref El-Hawary was born in Alexandria, Egypt on 3 February 1943 to Mahmoud Fahmy El-Hawary. El-Hawary graduated from Abbasia Senior High in 1960 with a General Secondary Education Certificate and his name was listed on the first outstanding students list, which granted him admittance to the University of Alexandria. In 1965, El-Hawary graduated there with a BSc in Electrical Power Engineering and subsequently received a scholarship from Izaak Walton Killam Memorial to study Ph.D. in the same field at the University of Alberta (1968-1972) with G. S. Christensen. Before travelling to Canada, he married Ferial El-Bibany, who became the president of IEEE Canada in the period between 2008 and 2009. They have two sons, Robert (Bob) and Ron El-Hawary, and one daughter, Bette.

El-Hawary died on Friday July 26, 2019 at the Halifax Infirmary QE II Hospital in Halifax, Nova Scotia, Canada.

Academic life 

El-Hawary has taught electrical and computer engineering at DalTech (previously known as Technical University of Nova Scotia (TUN)) of Dalhousie University since September 1981.

Between January 1974 to December 1980, El-Hawary served on engineering faculty at Memorial University of Newfoundland and was Chair of Electrical Engineering. He was Associate Professor of Electrical Engineering at COPPE, Federal University of Rio de Janeiro, Brazil, in the period between May 1972 to December 1973. He was an Instructor, in the Departments of Electrical Engineering, at the Universities of Alexandria and Alberta. In 1960, El-Hawary graduated from Abbasia Senior High, Alexandria, Egypt. He has a B.Sc. from the University of Alexandria (Class of 1965), and a Ph.D. in Electrical Engineering, the University of Alberta (1968-1972), Edmonton, where he was an Izaak Walton Killam Memorial fellow.

El-Hawary was a registered PEng. in the Association of Professional Engineers of Nova Scotia. He was a member of the founding committee responsible for establishing the IEEE Newfoundland and Labrador Subsection in 1975, and served in various capacities in the Subsection. El-Hawary served as Chair of IEEE Canada's Publications Committee, IEEE Canada Recognition and Awards Committee IEEE Canada, (1994-1998), Chair Recognition Working Group of the Power Systems Engineering Committee, IEEE, and Chair of IEEE Main Prize Paper Awards Committee. He was a Member of the IEEE Awards Board.

He was Chair of Power Engineering Education Committee's Life Long Learning Subcommittee, and chaired the Operating Economics Subcommittee in the Power Engineering Society. El-Hawary was President Canadian Society for Electrical Engineering and vice-president of Engineering Institute of Canada (1986–88). He wrote eleven textbooks and monographs, was author of over 162 referred Journal articles, 199 conference papers, and supervisor of 62 graduate students. El-Hawary was a member of the editorial board of IEEE/OUP Encyclopedia of Electrical and Computer Engineering.

He was Founding Editor, Power Letters, Power Engineering Society, and Associate Editor for the three major Electric Machines and Power Systems' Journals. He was also a lecturer for the IEEE Power and Energy Society, the IEEE Industry Applications Society, and IEEE Canada. El-Hawary was Editor of IEEE Expert Now Power Engineering Series, and Electrical Power Engineering, McGraw-Hill Encyclopedia of Science and Technology.

El-Hawary pioneered in many analytical and numerical computations to solve complicated problems of interconnected electric power systems that contains different types and technologies of generating machines, including: thermal, hydro, nuclear, solar, wind, tidal, and other renewable/sustainable/green energy resources. His research interests covered most of the fields of electric power engineering, including: power flow/optimal power flow, power system operation and operational planning, power system dynamic and control, power system protection and relaying, machinery design, smart grids and modern networks, renewable/sustainable/green energy, fuzzy systems and its applications, and artificial neural networks (ANNs) and its applications.

Medals and awards 

 1999: IEEE Canada General A.G.L. McNaughton Gold Medal
 1999: IEEE Educational Activities Board Meritorious Achievement Award
 2001: EIC Canadian Pacific and the Julian C. Smith Medals
 2010: IEEE Canada W.S. Read Outstanding Service Medal
 20xx: IEEE Power Engineering Educator of the Year Award

Publications

Books

Edited work

Presentations

Full refereed journal papers

Criticism 
El-Hawary was often criticized for poor academic performance inside the classroom.

References

External links

 "Interview with the Editor in Chief of the IEEE Systems, Man, and Cybernetics Magazine, Prof. Mo El-Hawary, Dalhousie University, Nova Scotia, Canada." Issue 54: March, 2016
 "eNewsletter Editor, the second issue of the IEEE SMC Society e-Newsletter." Issue 2: June, 2012
 2000 EIC Awards
 M. E. El-Hawary's webpage of the foundation members of IEEE Canada: http://www.ieeecanadianfoundation.org/EN/bios/mo.php
 M. E. El-Hawary's DBLP page: http://dblp.uni-trier.de/pers/hd/e/El=Hawary:Mohamed_E=
 

2019 deaths
Egyptian emigrants to Canada
Electrical engineering academics
Academic staff of Ain Shams University
Ain Shams University alumni
University of Alberta alumni
Dalhousie University
Canadian electrical engineers
Memorial University of Newfoundland
Federal University of Rio de Janeiro
1943 births
Fellow Members of the IEEE